Heteropsis comorana is a butterfly in the family Nymphalidae. It is found on the Comoro Islands (Grande Comore and Anjouan).

Subspecies
Heteropsis comorana comorana (Grand Comore)
Heteropsis comorana subrufa (Turlin, 1994) (Anjouan)

References

Elymniini
Butterflies described in 1916
Endemic fauna of the Comoros
Butterflies of Africa
Taxa named by Charles Oberthür